The 2010 UCI Women's Road Rankings is an overview of the UCI Women's Road Rankings, based upon the results in all UCI-sanctioned races of the 2010 women's road cycling season.

Summary
Final result.

Individual World Ranking (top 100)
Final result.

UCI Teams Ranking
This is the ranking of the UCI women's teams from 2010.Final result.

Nations Ranking (top 50)
Final result.

References

2010 in women's road cycling
UCI Women's Road World Rankings